Jeff Goodell is an American author and contributing editor to Rolling Stone magazine. Goodell's writings are known for a focus on energy and environmental issues.  He is Senior Fellow at the Atlantic Council and a 2020 Guggenheim Fellow.

Youth and education 
Jeff Goodell was born in Palo Alto, California. He grew up in Sunnyvale and worked briefly at Apple Computer in the early 1980s. He graduated from University of California, Berkeley, in 1984, then helped edit Zyzzyva, a literary magazine in San Francisco. He moved to New York City and attended graduate school at Columbia University, where he received an M.F.A. in 1990.

Career
Goodell started his journalism career at 7 Days, a Manhattan weekly founded and edited by Adam Moss. He covered cops, crime, AIDS, and politics. In 1990, 7 Days won a National Magazine Award for General Excellence. After freelancing for a few years, Goodell became a Contributing Editor at Rolling Stone in 1995. Since then, he has written hundreds of pieces for the magazine, including cover stories about climate politics, Steve Jobs, and President Barack Obama.

Goodell has published six books, including Sunnyvale (2000) a personal memoir about growing up in Silicon Valley and the breakdown of his family; Our Story: 77 Hours That Tested Our Friendship and Our Faith (2002), about the Pennsylvania Quecreek Mine Rescue of nine trapped coal miners in 2002, which was a New York Times Best Seller; and Big Coal: The Dirty Secret Behind America's Energy Future (2006), which the New York Times called "a compelling indictment of one of the country's biggest, most powerful and most antiquated industries...well-written, timely, and powerful."

In 2010 he published How to Cool the Planet: Geoengineering and the Audacious Quest to Fix Earth’s Climate about geoengineering, global warming, and climate change mitigation. The book discusses ideas by Ken Caldeira, James Lovelock, David Keith, Raymond Pierrehumbert, Stephen Salter, and Lowell Wood among others. In 2011, How to Cool the Planet won the Grantham Prize (Award of Special Merit).

His most recent book, The Water Will Come: Rising Seas, Sinking Cities, and the Remaking of the Civilized World, which describes visits to places likely to be inundated by rising sea levels, was published by Little, Brown in October 2017. It was a New York Times Critics Top Book of 2017 and selected by the Washington Post as one of the 50 best non-fiction books of 2017.

As a commentator on energy and climate issues, Goodell has appeared on NPR, MSNBC, CNN, CNBC, ABC, Fox News and The Oprah Winfrey Show.

Awards and honors
 2011 Grantham Prize (Award of Special Merit).
 2012 Sierra Club David R. Brower Award for excellence in environmental journalism.
 2020 American Meteorological Society Louis J. Battan Author's Award.
 2021 Covering Climate Now Journalism Award
 2022 New York Press Club Award

Fellowships
 2016-2017 New America National Fellow
 2020 Atlantic Council Senior Fellow
 2020 Guggenheim Fellow

Works
Books
 The Cyberthief and the Samurai: The True Story of Kevin Mitnick-And the Man Who Hunted Him Down (1996) 
 Sunnyvale: The Rise and Fall of a Silicon Valley Family (2000) 
 Our Story: 77 Hours That Tested Our Friendship and Our Faith (2002) 
 Big Coal: The Dirty Secret Behind America's Energy Future (2006) 
 How to Cool the Planet: Geoengineering and the Audacious Quest to Fix Earth’s Climate (2010) 
 The Water Will Come: Rising Seas, Sinking Cities, and the Remaking of the Civilized World (2017) 

Anthologies
 Best Business Writing 2012 (Columbia Journalism Review Books, 2012) 
 Best American Science Writing 2012 (Ecco, 2012) 
 Best American Science And Nature Writing 2022 (Mariner, 2022) 

Audiobooks
 The Big Melt: A Journey to Antarctica's Doomsday Glacier

References

American magazine editors
American male journalists
Sustainability advocates
American non-fiction environmental writers
Living people
Writers from Sunnyvale, California
Year of birth missing (living people)
Place of birth missing (living people)
Activists from California